The 246th Mixed Brigade, was a mixed brigade of the Spanish Republican Army in the Spanish Civil War. 

Projected in the winter in Catalonia shortly before the end of the war, it was not assigned to any division and it would be the last mixed brigade to be formed.

History

The decision to establish the 246th Mixed Brigade was taken in January 1939 amidst the chaos of the rebel faction's devastating Catalonia Offensive and the massive retreat of the Spanish Republican military and civilian columns towards the French border. As far as information is available, the brigade was in the process of being structured in Calella —also known as Calella de la Costa— a shoreline town in the Maresme north of Barcelona, but the names of the commanding officers in charge of the instruction of the recruits are unknown. 

In the face of the swift and steady advance of the Francoist armies in the heart of Catalonia, the constitution of this eleventh-hour brigade was next to impossible. It is not known whether it became operational and it thus probably existed only on paper.

See also
77th Division
Catalonia Offensive
Mixed Brigades

References

External links
El Pais – Pedro Corral explora en 'Desertores' los aspectos más humanos y menos épicos de la gran tragedia

Military units and formations established in 1939
Military units and formations disestablished in 1939
Mixed Brigades (Spain)